The Roman Catholic Diocese of Sandakan (Dioecesis Sandakaana) is located in east Malaysia. It is a suffragan diocese of the Archdiocese of Kota Kinabalu. The diocese is subdivided into 5 parishes and 1 mission district.

History
The diocese was created on 16 July 2007, from some territory of the Archdiocese of Kota Kinabalu. Julius Dusin Gitom was appointed as the first bishop of the diocese. The diocese covers the Sandakan and Tawau Divisions of Sabah State.

List of parishes
Five parishes and one mission are located in the Diocese of Sandakan.
 St. Mary's Cathedral Parish, Sandakan
 St. Dominic's Parish, Lahad Datu
 St. Martin's Parish, Telupid
 Holy Trinity Parish, Tawau
 Our Lady of Fatima Parish, Beluran
 Paitan Mission (St. Francis of Assisi's Chapel), Sandakan

Clergy

Bishop 
Julius Dusin Gitom, DD

Priests 
St Mary's Cathedral Parish, Sandakan
 Rector: Rev. Fr. David Garaman
 Assistant Rector(s): Rev. Fr. Christopher Ireneus, Rev. Fr. Dafrinn Diwol

Paitan Mission District
 Priest-in-Charge: Fr. Thomas Makajil

Holy Trinity Parish, Tawau
 Rector: Msgr. Nicholas Ong
 Assistant Rector(s): Rev. Fr. Stanley Matakim

Our Lady of Fatima Parish, Beluran
 Rector: Fr. Philip Muji

St Dominic's Parish, Lahad Datu
 Rector: Fr. Simon Jiwidi Kontou
 Assistant Rector(s): Fr. Marcellinus Madamit Pongking

St Martin's Parish, Telupid
 Rector: Unknown 
 Assistant Rector(s): Unknown

References

External links
 
 catholic-hierarchy.org
 GCatholic.org

Roman Catholic dioceses in Malaysia
Christian organizations established in 2007
Roman Catholic dioceses and prelatures established in the 21st century